is a town in Saitama Prefecture, Japan. , the town had an estimated population of 44,928  in 18,907 households and a population density of 3000 persons per km².

Geography
Located in central-east Saitama Prefecture, Ina is in the flatlands of the Kantō plains.The Ayase River runs along the eastern border, and the Haraichi Numa River runs along the western border. About 60% of the town area is located on the Omiya plateau, and the rest is the alluvial plain. The highest point in the town area is 19 meters above sea level.

Surrounding municipalities
Saitama Prefecture
 Ageo
 Okegawa
 Hasuda

Demographics
Per Japanese census data, the population of Ina has increased rapidly since the 1970s.

History
During the early Edo period, Ina was home to the short-lived (1590-1619) Komuro Domain founded by Ina Tadatsugu. It was afterward ruled as hatamoto territory under the direct control of the Tokugawa shogunate.

The villages of Komuro and Kobari were created in Kitaadachi District, Saitama with the establishment of the modern municipalities system on April 1, 1889. They were merged on July 15, 1943 to form the village of Ina. Ina was elevated to town status on November 1, 1970.

Government
Ina has a mayor-council form of government with a directly elected mayor and a unicameral town council of 16 members. Ina, together with the city of Ageo, contributes one member to the Saitama Prefectural Assembly. In terms of national politics, the town is part of Saitama 6th district of the lower house of the Diet of Japan.

Economy
The economy of Ina is primarily agricultural.

Education
Nihon Pharmaceutical University
Ina has four public elementary schools and three public middle schools operated by the town government, and one combined public middle/high schools operated by the Saitama Prefectural Board of Education. The town also has one private combined middle/high school and one private high school.

Transportation

Railway
  Saitama New Urban Transit - New Shuttle
 -  -  -  -

Highway
Ina is not served by any expressways or public highways

Local attractions
Saitama Cancer Center
Saitama Prefectural Mental Health Center

References

External links

Official website 

Towns in Saitama Prefecture
Ina, Saitama